Jacques Réda (born 24 January 1929 in Lunéville) is a French poet, jazz critic, and flâneur. He was awarded the Prix Valery Larbaud in 1983, and was chief editor of the Nouvelle Revue Française from 1987 to 1996.

Works
Amen (1968)
Récitatif (1971)
Les Ruines de Paris (1977) (The Ruins of Paris, trans. Mark Treharne, Reaktion Books, London, 1996)
L’Improviste, une lecture du jazz (1980) 
L’Herbe des talus (1984)
Celle qui vient à pas légers (1985)  
Jouer le jeu (L’Improviste II) (1985) 
Retour au calme (1989) (Return to Calm, trans. by Aaron Prevots, 2007, Host Publications, Inc.)
Le Sens de la marche (1990)
Aller aux mirabelles, Gallimard (1991) (English translation: The Mirabelle Pickers, trans. by Jennie Feldman, Anvil Press Poetry, London 2012)

References
 France, Peter (Ed.) (1995). The New Oxford Companion to Literature in French. Oxford: Clarendon Press. .
 Into the Deep Street. Seven Modern French Poets. 1938–2008, Edited and translated by Jennie Feldman and Stephen Romer, Anvil, London 2009.
 The Mirabelle Pickers, Translated by Jennie Feldman, Anvil, London 2012

People from Lunéville
1929 births
Living people
Winners of the Prix Broquette-Gonin (literature)
Prix Goncourt de la Poésie winners
Prix Valery Larbaud winners
French music critics
20th-century French poets
French male poets
Jazz writers
20th-century French male writers
French male non-fiction writers
Nouvelle Revue Française editors